Rostraureum is a genus of fungi in the family Cryphonectriaceae. The genus was erected in 2005 with a single species, namely Rostraureum tropicale.

References

External links

Monotypic Sordariomycetes genera
Diaporthales